Orchesella flavescens is a species of slender springtail in the family Entomobryidae. It is found in Europe. It is found predominantly in late spring and beginning of summer.

References

External links

 

Collembola
Articles created by Qbugbot
Animals described in 1839